The Fighting Ranger is a 1948 American Western film directed by Lambert Hillyer and written by Ronald Davidson. The film stars Johnny Mack Brown, Raymond Hatton, Christine Larson, Marshall Reed, Eddie Parker and Charlie Hughes. The film was released on August 15, 1948 by Monogram Pictures.

Plot

Cast          
Johnny Mack Brown as Johnny Brown
Raymond Hatton as Banty
Christine Larson as Julie Sinclair
Marshall Reed as Hack Sinclair
Eddie Parker as Gill 
Charlie Hughes as Dave Sinclair
I. Stanford Jolley as Pop Sinclair
Milburn Morante as Gus
Steve Clark as Ward Henderson
Bob Woodward as Bender
Peter Perkins as Adams

References

External links
 

1948 films
American Western (genre) films
1948 Western (genre) films
Monogram Pictures films
Films directed by Lambert Hillyer
American black-and-white films
1940s English-language films
1940s American films